The Relief of the Poor Act 1795 (36 Geo. III c. 23) was an Act of Parliament passed by the Parliament of Great Britain.

The Act amended the Poor Relief Act 1722 by repealing those clauses that prohibited outdoor relief. The Act claimed that this was necessary because the prohibition had been "found inconvenient and oppressive, inasmuch as it often prevents an industrious poor person from receiving such occasional relief as is best suited to his peculiar case, and in certain cases holds out conditions of relief injurious to the comfort and domestic situation and happiness of such poor persons".

The Act enabled poor relief overseers in every parish (with the permission from the vestry or a Justice of the Peace) to award poor relief to any industrious poor person in their home without requiring them to enter a workhouse. The Act also empowered Justices of the Peace to award poor relief to any industrious poor person in their home for one month. However, two Justices of the Peace could extend relief for another month "and so on from time to time, as the occasion shall require".

Notes

Great Britain Acts of Parliament 1795
1795 in British law
English Poor Laws